WR 69 is a Wolf–Rayet star located 11,350 light years away in the constellation of Triangulum Australe. It is classified as a WC9 star, belonging to the late-type carbon sequence. WR 69 is also a prolific dust maker, hence the "d" in its spectral type.

Binarity
WR 69 is mostly considered as a binary (WC9d+O star), with a supposed period of 2.293 days and an amplitude of 0.044 magnitudes, suggesting it could be a short period Colliding-Wind Binary. However, this period is not in fact due to binary, but due to the fast rotation of the WC9d star, which rotates quickly, once every 2.15 days, and at 40% of its breakup velocity. The WC9d star is likely part of a much longer binary system, hence the absorption lines found in its spectrum.

Properties
WR 69 is quite average for a WC9 star. Modelling WR 69's spectrum gives a temperature of 40,000 K, and a luminosity of ~214,000 L☉ is derived from Gaia DR2's parallax. From this a radius can be derived using the Stefan-Boltzmann Law, which turns out at just under 10 R☉. However, in the visual wavelength, the star is just 13,600 L☉ bright, because most of the 214,000 L☉ is emitted in the ultraviolet wavelength. WR 69 has 12.1 solar masses, but it likely started its life with much more than this.

WR 69 has a very strong stellar wind, typical of Wolf-Rayet stars. WR 69 loses 10-4.87 M☉ (about ) per year because of this stellar wind, which has a terminal velocity of 1,089 kilometres per second.

References

Wolf–Rayet stars
075377
136488
Triangulum Australe